Quba rugs and carpets are named for a town that is located in Azerbaijan Republic not far from the Caspian Sea; therefore, making Kubas a sub-division of Caucasian carpets. 1 Kuba is at once a city and an area that was formerly a Khanate (the equivalent to a state region in the traditional Persian system) of Azerbaijan.2  Within the Kuba genre itself, there exist many subdivisions including: Alpan-Kuba, Karagashli, Konaghend, Chi Chi, Perepedil, Seychour and Zejwa.3

Design 
Quba rugs are highly desired. Among the more popular types of Kubas are Chi-Chi and Konaghend patterns, which are coveted by collectors.  Noted for their detailed and tightly woven design, Kuba rugs are prized as the finest of all Caucasian rugs.4 Some medallion patterns are used, but Kuba rugs and carpets have hundreds of designs and do not utilize medallions as often as other regions' rugs.5

History 
During the 1920s, rugs of the Caucasus were greatly exported to the West in large quantity along with many older pieces that had been used in Russia.6

Materials and Structure 
Rugs from the Quba region are made from wool, though cotton is also used on rare occasion. = The wool is always composed of two strands, making it 2-ply. Warp will vary according to region, but ply consistently remains 2-ply. Kuba rugs in general are woven using a single-warp method:  the warp threads lie along the same level, as opposed to depressed warp where the warp threads alternate between are sunken and raised. Often the depressed threads are lowered as much as 75%.7 The threads are symmetrically knotted and the sides of Kuba rugs are finished with a blue or white selvage of wool or cotton.8 The warp ends are tied together in several rows of knots.

Shirvans and Dagestans
The Shirvan region, which is part of Azerbaijan, lies in the southern Caucasus where the mountain chain descends into the Caspian Sea. Historically, the rugs made in Kuba, Baku and Dagestan were also encompassed under the term Shirvan. 9 Kubas can be differentiated from Shirvan's and Dagestan's by dense, ribbed structure and higher knot count.10

The Kuba school that includes the Gonagkend and Divichi districts covers up to 35 pattern compositions of the carpets. Kuba is an historical region hosting plenitude of various tribes. Even now the region is populated by ethnic groups that speak different languages, among them Azerbaijanis, Lezghins, Tats, Budugs, Gyryzys and others. The Kuba carpets are remarkable for a wide variety of designs, which may differ even from village to village. The ornamental pattern is characterized by geometrical and botanic motifs, most of them stylized. These include Gyryz, Gymyl, Gonakend, Shahnezerli and other carpets. On the face of it, the ornamental pattern in the Kuba carpet group may appear to be too mixed and varied. However, on closer examination it becomes evident that all ornaments in the composition strictly follow a common design.

Carpet types

Kuba
The composition of the center field consists mainly of several gels and ketebe, which come one after another along the main axis in the vertical direction. Around these, there are scattered a lot of larger and smaller elements of different forms. Such elements can be encountered not only in the Kuba group carpets, but also in Shirvan, Baku and even Kazakh carpets with various compositions. The center field of such a compositions is viewed as "achig yerli". i.e. open or non-closed background. The Kuba carpet border ornamental patterns include various stripes, among them a center edge, a smaller edge, medahils. The element that serves as the prime ornament and constitutes the rapport of the edge, is referred to by the weavers as "tongal", i.e. bonfire. Such a name can be assumed to be related to the ancient fire-worshipper's beliefs. The color of the Kuba group carpets background is most often dark-navy blue or dark-sky blue.

Kehna Kuba
The composition of the center field of this red background carpet consists of three large octagonal medallions, which are lined up in the vertical direction. The medallions are of the same color, form and size. The medallions are set off by a rather narrow edge, which at the same time goes from the center field towards the border of the carpet. The edge itself is also one of the stripes in the overall border edge. In the center of the medallions there are small octagons framed by ornamental patterns (medahil and koshajag). The center field is surrounded by a common border, which consists of eight stripes.

Alpan
The Alpan carpets derive their name from the village of Alpan near the Susachai river. The composition of this carpet is widely spread in the villages of Susai and Sabat. Since the second half of the 19th century it was also picked up by carpet workshops of the Gusary district. Among the experts this carpet is also known as "Kuba", "Dagestan". The ornamental pattern is characterized by geometrical and vegetal motifs, most of them stylized. The medallions of the Kuba group carpets have a more intricate form as compared to carpets of other regions. The composition is based on gels and "hercheng" ("crawfish") – the elements that surround the medallions cornerwise. The Alpan carpet weavers refer to the medium-size gels as "charhovuz" ("pool"), while the minute elements inside the gel are called "ordek" ("ducks"). The rest of the center field contains stylized geometrical and vegetal elements of various forms. The dominant colors are dark-green and yellow hues. The carpet is notable for its high degree thickness and exquisite ornamental pattern.

Hyrdagul Chichi
The carpet is made in weaving centers of Kuba. The carpet is named "Hyrdagul Chichi" because the center field consists of minute elements that are called "hyrdagul" ("tiny flowers"). The overall composition of the center field is formed by several short rapports along the horizontal and vertical axes. These rapports contain a number of minute elements that are meant to fill, connect and substitute. The main element of the composition is known as "bashmag", being a stylized leaf. Each of the rest of the elements serve as a beginning or the center of the rapport. The carpet is framed by a border consisting of one center edge, two edges and a jag.

Alchagul Chichi
This carpet belongs to the village of Derechichi, Kuba district. While the rug weavers call it "Alchagul Chichi", among the carpet experts it is known as "Chichi". The carpets manufactured in Nabur, Shemakha, Alchiman, Shirvan (where they were influenced by technological and artistic trends) are named "Shirvan Chichi". The composition of the center field is mainly filled by the elements "Alchagul Chichi ". These recurring elements form horizontal and vertical rows. The border stripe consists of various width stripes, including jag, medahil, zenjira. Their ornamental pattern is characterized by geometrical and vegetal motifs, most of them stylized and distinguished by high thickness and exquisiteness. The pliability of the design and emotional expressiveness of the form and color are intended to convey the joyous perception of life. The artistic effect is further intensified through rhythm, symmetry and a clearly expressed composition, all of them following a common harmony.

Syrt Chichi
The Syrt Chichi carpet belongs to the village of Derechichi. Among the arts and carpet experts it is also known as "Chichi". The carpets manufactured in Nabur, Shemakha, Alchiman, Shirvan (where they were influenced by technological and artistic trends) are named "Shirvan Chichi". The composition of the center field is mainly filled by the elements "Syrt Chichi ".These recurring elements form horizontal and vertical rows. The border stripe consists of various width stripes, including jag, medahil, zenjira.

Golu Chichi
The Syrt Chichi carpet belongs to the village of Derechichi. Among the arts and carpet experts it is also known as "Chichi". The carpets manufactured in Nabur, Shemakha, Alchiman, Shirvan (where they were influenced by technological and artistic trends) are named "Shirvan Chichi". The composition of the center field is mainly filled by the elements "Syrt Chichi ".These recurring elements form horizontal and vertical rows. The border stripe consists of various width stripes, including jag, medahil, zenjira.

Gymyl
Gymyl was first woven in Gabala in the 14th-15th centuries. Later, beginning with the 18th century, it spread over to Kuba and individual carpet workshops of the Kuba district. As a result, moving further away from the village of Gymyl the carpet gradually lost its artistic values and underwent a number of distortions. In the middle of the center field there is a polygonal oblong medallion. This medallion used to be called "khoncha", however in the second half of the 19th century it became widely known among the carpet weavers under the name "tray". Typically to this composition, to the top and bottom of the medallion there are four large polygonal elements, which are called "sham" ("candle", "lantern"). The composition of the center field of the Gymyl carpet is formed by the stylized images of a whole range of objects and decorations. It resembles a picture of a wedding or a feast.

Garagashly
The famous carpet Garagashly of the Kuba group is made in the villages of Haji-Garagashly, Chai-Garagashly and Susanly-Garahashly of the Divichi district. On the center field along the vertical axis there are small medallions. The oldest carpet weavers and experts believe that these medallions depict "musical instruments". Between the medallions there are elements of various types, colloquially named "gushbashy"("bird's head"). The typical color of the Garagashly center field background is dark-navy blue or dark-red. In rare cases one can Garagashly carpets with a dark-sky blue or white background. The ornamental pattern is characterized by geometrical and vegetal motifs, most of them being stylized and notable for their high thickness and exquisiteness.

Shakhnazarli
The name comes from the name of the village of Shakhnazerli. This type of the carpet includes 35 compositions. In spite of the fact that the Shakhnazarli carpet production centers are the villages of Shakhnazerli, Melkham, Geylere, Gonakend, it was also made in the villages of the Kuba, Shemakha and Agsu districts. The composition of the center field is mainly formed by several gels placed along the vertical axis. Typically to this carpet, within the center field there are two gubps or two bashlyg, one of them in the bottom part, at the beginning of the first gel, while the second one – in the upper part, at the end of the last gel. These gubps, heavily stylized, not only impart completeness and final shape to the gels, but also perfect the composition of the center field and improve the grouping of the gels. In Azerbaijan and in Central Asia, the folk rug makers and craftsmen call any carpet with many medallions "Gellu", irrespective of the composition. These gels, most of them of an octagonal shape and decorated by an edge or small squares, by virtue of their simplicity and vivid colors differ significantly from the gels of the Kazakh, Karabakh and South-Azerbaijan carpets. The highly stylized gubps make the carpet look complete, improve the composition and help in grouping the gels. The high thickness, rich decoration of the ornamental pattern, delicate weaving constitute characteristic features of this carpet group.

Great Pirebedil
Historically, this carpet was first made in the 15th century in the town of Great in Afghanistan. Later, it spread in the southern regions of Azerbaijan, under different names. In particular, it known as "Balyg" in Karabakh.

Pirebedil
This carpet derives its name from the village of Pirebedil. The local carpet makers call this carpet "Burma", "Gyrman", sometimes "Gaichi". Some of the oldest carpet weavers and arts experts refer to it as "Migradi" or "Grou", which is a modification of the Arab word "menrou" ("scissors"). To the left and right of the center field there is an element that is typical only to this carpet type and resembles scissors by its shape. The Pirebedil carpets are more ancient than any other Azerbaijani carpet. The basic elements are "gaichi" or "buinuzu" ("horns") on the left and right sides of the carpet as a symbol heroism and courage, an image of a turkey cock in the middle of the center field and along its edge line, leaves of fruit trees and octagonal gels. Typically, the color of the background of the center field is dark-navy blue or dark-red.

Zeiva
This carpet derives its name from the village of Zeiva to the SE of Kuba. In foreign sources it is referred to as the Shirvan carpet. It is also known under the name of "Gadym Zeiva". The typical composition of the center field of the Zeiva includes a sequence of a number of gels along the central axis. By their shape and origin these gels, which form the main element of the Zeiva carpet and are reproducible entirely by dotted lines, can be attributed to the Middle Age period. These gels come of various types and are encountered in the decorative art not  only in the Caucasus but also in the Baltic states, where they are most typical to the art of carpet weaving and embroidery. Around these gels, in an asymmetrical arrangement there are various filling elements called "sakkizbujagly", "garmagly", "alma". Typically, the center field background color is dark-red, dark-navy blue, beige.

Alikhanly
The Alikhanly carpet is included into the Kuba group of the Kuba-Shirvan type. The name is derived from the village of Alikhanly in the Siazan district. This carpet is also made in the NE Azerbvaijan, namely in the Devechi district. In his "Gulustan Irem" A. Bakikhanov associates the name of the village of Alikhanly with the wall "Algon" and assumes that its actual name is "Algonly". He gives the following explanation: "This wall was built by Isfandiyar (the 6th century BC), and restored by Anushirivan (the 4th century)". The center field composition is mainly made of several large gels, placed one after the other long the central vertical axis. The gels shape is curve-linear and toothed. In the center field of the carpet, along its horizontal axis there are one, two or, in rare instances, three gels. The ornamental pattern consists of intricate motifs represented by broken lines. These motifs were created by the Middle Ages carpet craftsmen.

Gonagkend
The Gonagkend carpets were made in the 18th-19th centuries. Their artistic and decorative features were gradually modified and as a result the carpets now look completely different from the Khorasan carpets, which are believed to be their prototype. The main composition of the Gonakend carpet is formed by a large medallion located in the middle of the center field. Inside the medallion, there are 8 small crosses arranged centrally. The medallions are decorated by the elements of the geometrical lines, which resemble images of some primitive farm tools. This carpet looks significantly different from its ancestor and is now ranked among the national Azerbaijani carpets. Due to the expansion of trade-fairs in the 18th century and especially in the second half of the 20th century, the composition of this carpet began to be used in the flat-woven large-size carpets.

Gedim Minare
In the center field composition the element "zenjire", otherwise called "daragy", is placed from the left and right sides towards the central axis and forms several new squares or quadrangles. These new square or quadrangular surfaces in most cases are covered by a mesh of small squares in black, red or white. The background of the middle field is normally dark-navy blue or red.

Ugah
The Ugah carpets derive their names from the village of Ugah not far away from Kuba. The composition of the center field consists of short length rapports and is covered by vegetal elements of only one shape. People call it "takhang" ("grape leaf"). It represents the main element of the carpet and is placed at the points of the intersections of the lines that mark the beginning and the center of the rapports, i.e. the lines, which form the grid of the squares. The more rapports are arranged lengthwise and crosswise, i.e. the larger the carpet size the lower the carpet's artistic value. The origin of the border stripes motifs goes back to vegetal ornamental patterns, adopted from the patterns used in various fields of the decorative and applied arts. The center edge called by the carpet weavers "chichekli" can be also found in Karabakh carpets "Nelbeki-gul". As to the colors, the background of this carpet is dark-brown or dark cobalt.

Yerfi
This carpet derives its name from the village of Yerfi. It also is produced in the villages of Nokhurduzu, Gayadally, Dark, Talysh, Hyrt, Garabulag. Some experts believe that this is the Shirvan carpet. The oldest craftsmen also refer to it as "Heymegah" (" a place for setting up a tent"). The elements of the center field of the Yerfi carpets are arranged along small vertical axes. The center field décor consists mainly of two principal elements of different shapes, each forming a separate horizontal line. The first row is formed by the elements of the "sachaglylar" group (fringed), which more often are encountered in the Shirvan carpet group. The second row features the elements called "chadyr"("A tent"), which is considered to be the main gel (medallion) of the carpet. These elements are found in many Azerbaijani carpets and their origin dates back to the ancient times. They are woven in every third raw, while the main elements are woven in every second raw. The border ornamental patterns are largely composed of 3 stripes, including the center edge ketebe and smaller edge "chakhmaghy" typical to the Baku carpets and running along the sides of ketebe. This smaller edge can be identified in "The Family", the painting by Lorenzo Loto, an Italian painter of the 16th century (1480-1556). The color of the border stripes varies depending on the color of the center field. An artistic analysis of the Yerfi carpet makes it possible to conclude that the composition of its center field is adopted mainly from the flat-weave rugs typical to the nomadic tribes.

Gyryz
The composition of the center field of the Gyryz carpet consists mainly of several large gels arranged along the central vertical axis. The gels in such carpets are of a "khoncha" or "tabag" shape, with rhomboid elements to the left and to the right. Craftsmen call these elements "gulli yaylyg". In the center of the gels there is an element called "aypara" ("crescent"). It is believed to depict a wedding khoncha. Typical to the Gyryz carpets are the images of the pair of ear rings in between the gels, lined up images of birds and individual elements of various forms and shapes.

Butaly
This carpet of the Kuba group of the Kuba-Shirvan type belongs to the village of Derechichi of the Kuba district. Similar carpets are made in the villages of Nabur, Shemakha, Alchiman, Shirvan, where they underwent local technological and artistic modifications. The composition of the center field is mainly filled by the "buta" elements only. These recurrent elements form rows lengthwise and crosswise. The border stripe consists of various width stripes, including "jag", "medakhil", "zenjire". The ornamental pattern is stylized and stands out due to its high degree of thickness and exquisite decoration. The pliability of the design and emotional expressiveness of the form and color are intended to convey the joyous perception of life. The artistic effect is further intensified through rhythm, symmetry and a clearly expressed composition, all of them following a common harmony.

Gullu
This carpet belongs to the village of Derechichi. The center field is filled by the "gul" elements only. These recurrent elements form rows lengthwise and crosswise. The border stripe consists of various width stripes, including "jag", "medakhil", "zenjire".

See also 
 Absheron carpet weaving school

References 

Neff, Ivan C. and Carol V. Maggs. Dictionary of Oriental Rugs. London: AD. Donker LTD, 1977.  
Gans-Ruedin, E. Caucasian Carpets. New York: Rizzoli, 1986.  
Eiland, Murray L. Oriental Rugs. Boston: New York Graphic Society, 1976.

External links 
Images of Kuba Rugs

Azerbaijani rugs and carpets
Azerbaijani culture